The  is a limited-stop "Home Liner"-style service to and from Kuki Station in Saitama on the Tobu Isesaki Line operated by the private railway operator Tobu Railway in Japan since June 2020.

Service outline 
In the up direction, a supplement of 580 yen (300 yen for children) is required for travel between the serviced Hibiya Line stations and Sengendai station, and 680 yen (350 yen for children) beyond as far as Kuki station. No supplementary fare is required for passengers boarding the service between Kasumigaseki to Ebisu. All seats are reserved, and the supplementary tickets indicate which car to ride in.

Rolling stock 
TH Liner services are operated by a fleet of 70090 series 7-car electric multiple units (EMUs). Like their 50090 series counterparts, these sets are unusual in having rotating pairs of seats allowing them to be used with longitudinal seating on regular daytime services, and with transverse seating on TH Liner services.

Station stops 
Morning "Up" services start at Kuki and terminate at Ebisu. Evening "Down" services start at Kasumigaseki and terminate at Kuki. For the morning "up" services, the service only picks up passengers between Kuki and Shin-Koshigaya. Between Ueno and Ginza, passengers can only get off the train. Starting at Kasumigaseki, passengers may get on and off at any of the serviced Hibiya line stations until the terminus at Ebisu. For the evening "down" services, passengers can only get on the train at the Hibiya Line stations starting at Kasumigaseki. Starting at Shin-Koshigaya, passengers may only get off the train until the terminus at Kuki.

●: Stop, ○: Stop (only available for boarding), ◎: Stop (only available for getting off)

History

2019 
On 26 March 2019, the Tokyo Metro and private operator Tobu Railway revealed plans to operate a reserved-seat Home Liner service that would connect the Tobu Isesaki Line and the Hibiya Line. The rolling stock for this service would be a new variant of the 70000 series introduced in 2017. Later on 19 December, additional details were announced such as the name of the service, stopping pattern, and schedule.

2020 
On 6 June 2020 the TH Liner began service.

See also 
 TJ Liner
 List of named passenger trains of Japan

References 

Railway services introduced in 2020
Named passenger trains of Japan
Tobu Skytree Line
2020 establishments in Japan